PIGB opposite strand 1 is a protein that in humans is encoded by the PIGBOS1 gene.

References

Further reading